Perfidy may refer to:

Perfidy in war, a criminal form of deception, in which one side promises to act in good faith (e.g. by raising a flag of surrender) with the intention of breaking that promise once the enemy has exposed himself.
Perfidy (film) (1953), is a Yugoslavian drama film directed by Vladimir Pogacic. It was entered into the 1953 Cannes Film Festival.
Perfidy (book) (1961), written by Ben Hecht, it details the events surrounding the Rudolf Kastner trial.

See also
 Perfidious Albion, a nickname for Great Britain (or often just England)